Gligorije is a masculine given name. It may refer to:

Gligorije Elezović (1879–1960), Serbian historian
Gligorije Trlajić (1766–1811), Serbian writer, poet, polyglot and professor

See also
Grigorije
Grgur

Serbian masculine given names